Jehanabad is a town in Nagar Parishad and is the headquarters of Jehanabad district in the Indian state of Bihar.

Demographics
According to the Indian census of 2001, the Jehanabad had a population of 135,196. The population is 54% male and 46% female. Jehanabad has a literacy rate of 77%, higher than the national average of 74.04%. Male literacy is 83% and female literacy is 69%. 16% percent of Jehanabad's population is under six years of age.

Transport
National Highways 83 and NH 110 cross through the city. No. 83 runs from Patna via Masaurhi, and goes directly to Gaya through Makhdumpur. It runs almost parallel to the railway line. A network of poor quality PWD roads and REO roads run across the district. The total length of paved roads is 541.65 km and that of mud tracks is 450.90 km.

Notable People
Samprada Singh
Mahendra Prasad

References

External links
 Statistics on Bihar government website
 

 
Cities and towns in Jehanabad district